The Minister of Marketing in New Zealand is a former cabinet position (existing from 1936 to 1953) appointed by the Prime Minister to be in charge of matters of promoting New Zealand's commercial growth and trade to both domestic and foreign markets. The minister was responsible for the New Zealand Marketing Department and, from 1950, the minister oversaw a Marketing Advisory Council. In 1960 the Overseas Trade portfolio was created with similar duties.

List of ministers
The following ministers held the office of Minister of Marketing.

Key

Notes

References

Marketing
Political office-holders in New Zealand